Dive Bar Tour can refer to

 Dive Bar Tour (Lady Gaga), Lady Gaga's tour with that name
 Dive Bar Tour (Garth Brooks), Garth Brooks' tour with that name